Otto Matieson (27 March 1893 – 19 February 1932) was a Danish actor of the silent era. He appeared in 45 films between 1920 and 1931. He was born in Copenhagen, Denmark, and died in a car accident in Safford, Arizona.

Filmography

 The Golden Trail (1920)
 Scaramouche (1923)
 The Dangerous Maid (1923)
 Boston Blackie (1923)
 Revelation (1924)
 Captain Blood (1924)
 The Folly of Vanity (1924)
 The Salvation Hunters (1925)
 The Happy Warrior (1925)
 Morals for Men (1925)
 Parisian Love (1925)
 Bride of the Storm (1926)
 Yellow Fingers (1926)
 Whispering Wires (1926)
 The Silver Treasure (1926)
 Christine of the Big Tops (1926)
 While London Sleeps (1926)
 The Beloved Rogue (1927)
 Old San Francisco (1927)
 Surrender (1927)
 The Last Moment (1928)
 The Scarlet Lady (1928)
 The Woman from Moscow (1928)
 The Show of Shows (1929)
 Prisoners (1929)
 General Crack (1929)
 Golden Dawn (1930)
 Conspiracy (1930)
 A Soldier's Plaything (1930)
 Beau Ideal (1931)
 The Maltese Falcon (1931)
 Men of the Sky (1931)

External links

1893 births
1932 deaths
Road incident deaths in Arizona
Danish male film actors
Danish male silent film actors
20th-century Danish male actors
Danish emigrants to the United States